Next Floor is a 2008 Canadian dark comedy short film directed by Denis Villeneuve. The film, largely wordless, depicts a group of eleven people endlessly gorging themselves on raw meats at a banquet.

Synopsis
During an opulent and luxurious banquet, attended by servers and valets, eleven pampered guests participate in what appears to be ritualistic gastronomic carnage.

Characters and cast
 Maître D • Jean Marchand
 Servers • Mathieu Handfield, Sébastien René, Emmanuel Schwartz
 Diners • Simone Chevalot, Ken Fernandez, Ariel Ifergan, Sergiy Marchenko, Deepak Massand, Gaétan Nadeau, Charles Papasoff, Daniel Rousse, Helga Schmitz, Dennis St-John, Valérie Wiseman

Production background
The film was conceived by producer Phoebe Greenberg and directed by Villeneuve during a break from production of his feature film Polytechnique.

Release and reception
The film premiered at the 2008 Cannes Film Festival, as part of the Semaine de la critique program.

Critical response
For Indiewire, journalist Zach Hollwedel theorized that the banquet attendees were in hell, and being forced to atone for their gluttonous lifestyles when they were alive, or that the film was a metaphorical comment on the voracious and destructive nature of human consumerism.

Accolades
At Cannes, the film received the Canal+ prize for the best short film in its program.

The film received a special jury citation for the Toronto International Film Festival Award for Best Canadian Short Film at the 2008 Toronto International Film Festival, and won the Genie Award for Best Live Action Short Drama at the 29th Genie Awards and the Prix Jutra for Best Short Film at the 11th Jutra Awards.

References

External links
 
 Next Floor on YouTube

2008 films
2008 black comedy films
2008 short films
Best Live Action Short Drama Genie and Canadian Screen Award winners
Films directed by Denis Villeneuve
2000s English-language films
2000s Canadian films
Canadian black comedy films
Canadian comedy short films